Miško is a South Slavic masculine given name. It may refer to:

Miško Kranjec, Slovenian writer
Miško Mirković, retired Serbian footballer
Miško Šuvaković, Serbian artist

See also
Mišković

Slavic masculine given names
Serbian masculine given names